The 1967 season in Japanese football

League tables

Japan Soccer League

Promotion/relegation Series

Nagoya Mutual Bank promoted, Toyoda Automatic Loom Works relegated.

Team of The Year

NHK Cup

In between the League and the Emperor's Cup (which was played in January 1968 in order to allow for a change of format for the next season), a special match pitting the JSL champions Toyo Industries against All Japan University Soccer Tournament winners Kansai University was played in New Year, 1968. It was a predecessor to the later Japanese Super Cup, which began to be played in 1977, by which time the university teams had ceased to be viable contenders to the Emperor's Cup.

References 

1967
1
Jap
Jap